R. Kanagasabai Pillai was an Indian politician and former Member of Parliament elected from Tamil Nadu. He was elected to the Lok Sabha from Chidambaram constituency as an Indian National Congress candidate in 1957 and 1962 elections.

He also served as a Member of the Legislative Assembly of Tamil Nadu. He was elected to the Tamil Nadu legislative assembly as an Indian National Congress candidate from Chidambaram constituency in the 1967 election.

References 

Indian National Congress politicians from Tamil Nadu
Living people
India MPs 1957–1962
India MPs 1962–1967
Lok Sabha members from Tamil Nadu
People from Cuddalore district
Year of birth missing (living people)